Margaret Rosalind Delacourt-Smith, Baroness Delacourt-Smith of Alteryn, JP (née Hando) (5 April 1916 – 8 June 2010), known as Lady Delacourt-Smith from 1967, was a British Labour politician.

Biography
Margaret Rosalind Hando was born in 1916. Her father, Fred Hando, was an artist, writer and headmaster. Hando was married to politician Charles Delacourt-Smith. The couple changed their surname of Smith to Delacourt-Smith by deed poll in 1967, the same year Delacourt-Smith entered the House of Lords. 

She was created a life peer is her own right as Baroness Delacourt-Smith of Alteryn, of Alteryn in the County of Gwent on 5 July 1974.

She died on 8 June 2010, aged 94.

References

1916 births
2010 deaths
Life peeresses created by Elizabeth II
Delacourt-Smith of Alteryn
Place of birth missing
Place of death missing